Steven Georganas (born 13 June 1959) is an Australian politician and is the Australian Labor Party member for the House of Representatives seat of Adelaide in South Australia since the 2019 Australian federal election. Previously, he had been the member for Hindmarsh from 2004 to 2013 and again from 2016 to 2019.

Background
Georganas was born in Adelaide of Greek parents. He gained a Business Studies Certificate at a TAFE college and worked as a taxi driver, an assembly-line worker in a factory, and an underwriter. He worked as a ministerial adviser to South Australian government minister Jay Weatherill from 2002 to 2004.

Political career

Elections 
Georganas was the Labor Party candidate for Hindmarsh at the 1998 federal election and the 2001 federal election, but was unsuccessful on both occasions.

At the 2004 federal election, Georganas defeated Liberal candidate Simon Birmingham, winning Hindmarsh by 108 votes. He was re-elected with increased majorities at the 2007 and 2010 federal elections.

Georganas was defeated by Liberal candidate Matt Williams at the 2013 federal election when the Australian Labor Party lost government. Georganas was successful at recapturing the seat for Labor at the 2016 federal election.

A redistribution ahead of the 2019 federal election saw the neighbouring seat of Port Adelaide abolished, with most of its territory being transferred to Hindmarsh. The redistribution made Hindmarsh significantly more secure for Labor, boosting the Labor majority to 8.2 percent. Soon afterward, the Left and Right factions of SA Labor reached a deal that saw Georganas relinquish Hindmarsh to the incumbent MP for Port Adelaide, former federal Labor president Mark Butler. In return, Georganas was given Labor preselection for Adelaide, after the incumbent MP, Kate Ellis, announced that she was retiring. Adelaide was made safer for Labor at the redistribution, having a nominal majority of 9 percent.

Policy positions 
Georganas campaigned on noise reduction surrounding the Adelaide Airport, and in 2007 introduced a Private member's bill to create an Aircraft Noise Ombudsman.

He is a prominent advocate for animal welfare and curtailing live animal exports, speaking at rallies and tabling motions in parliament calling for the practice to be condemned and fines to be imposed for animal cruelty. He also campaigned for the super-trawler FV Margiris to be banned from fishing in Australia.

Georganas voted in support of same-sex marriage in Australia when the issue was debated in parliament in 2013.

He has also campaigned for a 'Do Not Knock' register to ban door-to-door salespeople from visiting registered properties, and introduced a Private member's bill to create a register in 2012.

Georganas left Labor Left, the faction that had supported him since the 1990s, in May 2019. Georganas joined several other South Australian MPs, candidates and members who had resigned from the left to join Labor Unity, including Tony Piccolo MP in 2013 and candidate Jo Chapley in 2018.

Personal life 
Georganas has lived in the suburb of Mile End, currently in the electorate of Adelaide, his entire life. He has two adult sons; George and Alex.

He is a supporter of the West Adelaide Football Club, and a member of the club's board of directors. He is also involved in numerous community organizations, including as president of his local Lions club, and as a board member of the Adelaide Greek Glendi Festival.

References

External links
Profile: ALP.org.au

1959 births
Living people
Australian Labor Party members of the Parliament of Australia
Members of the Australian House of Representatives for Hindmarsh
Members of the Australian House of Representatives for Adelaide
Politicians from Adelaide
Australian people of Greek descent
Australian taxi drivers
Labor Right politicians
21st-century Australian politicians